The Thailand national ice hockey team is the national men's ice hockey team of Thailand. The team is controlled by the Ice Hockey Association of Thailand and a member of the International Ice Hockey Federation. Thailand is currently ranked at fifty-first in the IIHF World Rankings and have been entered in the World Championship tournaments since 2019 but have not yet participated at any Olympic Games. They have played in the Challenge Cup of Asia, a regional tournament for lower-tier hockey nations in Asia.

The first official hockey league in Thailand, the Bangkok Ice Hockey league (BIHL) was founded in 2014. The majority of the practices and games for the handful of teams in the BIHL are held at the two rinks inside of Central Rama 9 and Imperial World in Samrong, two of Bangkok's popular shopping malls. Currently, most of Thailand's national hockey players are playing on the BIHL with a player as young as 15 years old.

Tournament record

World Championships
2019 United Arab Emirates – 49th place
2020 – Cancelled due to the coronavirus pandemic
2021 – Cancelled due to the COVID-19 pandemic
2022 – 43rd place

Asian Winter Games
2003 Aomori – 5th place
2007 Changchun – 9th place
2011 Astana – 6th place ( 2nd in Premier Division)
2017 Sapporo – 5th place ( 1st in Division I)

Challenge Cup of Asia
2008 Hong Kong – 4th place 
2009 Abu Dhabi –  Runners-up
2010 Taipei City –  3rd place
2011 Kuwait City –  3rd place
2012 Dehradun –  Runners-up
2013 Bangkok – 5th place
2014 Abu Dhabi – 4th place
2015 Taipei City – 4th place
2016 Abu Dhabi – 4th place
2017 Bangkok –  3rd place
2018 Pasay –  Runners-up

Southeast Asian Games
2017 Kuala Lumpur –  Runners-up
2019 Philippines –  1st

All-time record against other nations
Last match update: 24 August 2017

References

External links
IIHF profile
National Teams of Ice Hockey

Ice hockey in Thailand
National ice hockey teams in Asia
Ice hockey
2003 establishments in Thailand